Presidential elections were held in Portugal on 25 July 1965, during the Estado Novo regime of Prime Minister António de Oliveira Salazar, following parliamentary elections in the same year. It was the first presidential election to be held by the National Assembly of Portugal rather than by direct popular ballot and, subsequently, rear admiral Thomaz was universally endorsed for a second seven-year term. His only opponent in the preceding 1958 election, general Humberto Delgado, had been assassinated in early 1965 following an attempt to return to Portugal from exile, possibly to contest Thomaz' election for a second time.

Results

References

Portugal
1965 in Portugal
Presidential elections in Portugal
July 1965 events in Europe